Proprioseiopsis iorgius is a species of mite in the family Phytoseiidae.

References

iorgius
Articles created by Qbugbot
Animals described in 1976